Erbessa semiplaga is a moth of the  family Notodontidae. It is found in Colombia.

References

Moths described in 1905
Notodontidae of South America
Taxa named by William Warren (entomologist)